The following numbered county roads exist in Charlotte County, Florida. As with most Florida counties, numbers are assigned in a statewide grid.

County road list

References

FDOT map of Charlotte County, Florida
FDOT GIS data, accessed January 2014

 
County